Ben Chong Chen Bin is a Malaysian politician who has served as Member of the Sabah State Legislative Assembly (MLA) for Tanjong Kapor since May 2018. He served as the State Assistant Minister of Trade and Industry of Sabah in the Heritage Party (WARISAN) state administration under former Chief Minister Shafie Apdal and former State Minister Wilfred Madius Tangau from May 2018 to the collapse of WARISAN state administration in September 2020. He is an independent in support of the Gabungan Rakyat Sabah (GRS) coalition until February 21, 2023. He was member of the GAGASAN, the major component of Gabungan Rakyat Sabah (GRS) since 2023.

Election results

References

Members of the Sabah State Legislative Assembly
Former Sabah Heritage Party politicians
Living people
Year of birth missing (living people)